Mischief Management, LLC is a company that organizes annual fandom-based conferences, including BroadwayCon, GeekyCon, Con of Thrones, and LeakyCon.

Events

BroadwayCon
BroadwayCon is a fan convention for the theater community, co-created by Mischief Management and Anthony Rapp, which takes place in January in New York City.

Con of Thrones
Con of Thrones is a convention for fans of Game of Thrones, A Song of Ice and Fire, and the epic worlds of fantasy author George R. R. Martin. The convention began in 2017 and is holding its third iteration in 2019.

GeekyCon
GeekyCon targets the online fandoms of Doctor Who, Supernatural, Glee, Marvel Cinematic Universe, and Disney. In 2016, it was announced that GeekyCon was on hiatus.

LeakyCon

LeakyCon is a conference originally hosted by the Harry Potter fan site, The Leaky Cauldron.

References

External links
Mischief Management

Privately held companies of the United States